James Guy Barrett (5 November 1930  – 21 October 2014) was an English footballer who played for West Ham United. His father, James William Barrett, also played for the club from 1924 to 1939.

Born in West Ham, Essex, Jim Jnr played football as a junior for West Ham, and played with his father as a teenager for West Ham A in 1945–46. He signed for the senior side in February 1949 and went on to make 85 league and 2 cup appearances for the east London club, scoring 25 goals.

He was sold to Nottingham Forest in December 1954, and went on to become their top scorer for the 1956–57 season. He also played for Birmingham City, playing 10 games and scoring four goals before his playing career ended aged 29.

He later returned to West Ham to become player-manager of the A team assisting the development of players such as Harry Redknapp, John Charles and Paul Heffer. He moved to Millwall in 1968, where he worked under ex-Hammer Ben Fenton. Barrett died in 2014, aged 83.

References

External links

1930 births
2014 deaths
Footballers from West Ham
English footballers
West Ham United F.C. players
Nottingham Forest F.C. players
Birmingham City F.C. players
West Ham United F.C. non-playing staff
Millwall F.C. non-playing staff
Association football coaches
Association football forwards
English Football League players